Vivian is a town in Caddo Parish, Louisiana, United States and is home to the Red Bud Festival. The population was 3,671 at the 2010 census, down from 4,031 in 2000. According to 2020 census data, Vivian is now the fourth-largest municipality in Caddo Parish by population (after Blanchard, Greenwood, and Shreveport).

History

Vivian developed as a trading center and center of a retail area that included smaller towns in the area. During its heyday, people from the region used to visit Vivian for shopping and movies, especially on the weekends.

Geography
Vivian is in northwestern Caddo Parish. Louisiana Highway 1 passes through the center of the town, leading north  to the Texas border at the northwest corner of Louisiana, and south  to Shreveport. LA 2 leads east  to U.S. Route 71 in Hosston.

Demographics

As of the 2020 United States census, there were 3,073 people, 1,395 households, and 898 families residing in the town. As of the census of 2000, there were 4,031 people, 1,569 households, and 1,019 families residing in the town.

In 2000, the racial makeup of the town was 63.90% White, 34.19% African American, 0.52% Native American, 0.35% Asian, 0.02% from other races, and 1.02% from two or more races. Hispanic or Latino of any race were 0.72% of the population. By 2020, the racial makeup was 50.15% non-Hispanic white, 41.91% African American, 0.91% Asian, 4.62% multiracial, and 1.95% Hispanic or Latino of any race.

There were 1,569 households, out of which 32.3% had children under the age of 18 living with them, 42.2% were married couples living together, 19.4% had a female householder with no husband present, and 35.0% were non-families. 31.7% of all households were made up of individuals, and 17.0% had someone living alone who was 65 years of age or older. The average household size was 2.51 and the average family size was 3.16.

In the town, the population was spread out, with 29.9% under the age of 18, 8.4% from 18 to 24, 23.6% from 25 to 44, 19.9% from 45 to 64, and 18.2% who were 65 years of age or older. The median age was 36 years. For every 100 females, there were 81.7 males. For every 100 females age 18 and over, there were 74.9 males.

At the 2000 census, the median income for a household in the town was $23,800, and the median income for a family was $29,867. Males had a median income of $26,844 versus $17,500 for females. The per capita income for the town was $13,267. About 21.4% of families and 26.2% of the population were below the poverty line, including 42.0% of those under age 18 and 14.6% of those age 65 or over.

Government
The current mayor is Mike VanSchoick.

Education
The town's single government-sponsored cultural organization is the North Caddo Branch of the Shreve Memorial Library. The library is housed in the once-abandoned, now-restored North Caddo Elementary Middle School building.

Media 
Caddo Citizen is the newspaper. Radio stations broadcasting from Vivian include KNCB (AM) (1329) classic rock, and KNCB-FM (105.3) classic country.

Notable people
 Dan Flores, historian of the American West, born in Vivian in 1948
 Phil Robertson, inventor of Duck Commander Duck Calls and television personality on Duck Dynasty, born in Vivian in 1946
 Silas Robertson (born 1948), television personality
 Jasper Smith (1905-1992), Vivian lawyer, city attorney, and member of the Louisiana House of Representatives from 1944 to 1948 and then 1952 to 1964.
 Robert Williams III, power forward and center for the Boston Celtics

Filming location
Exterior shots of the supermarket in the film The Mist were shot in Vivian in 2007 at Tom's Market, and outdoor scenes for Straw Dogs (2011) were filmed in the downtown region in 2009.

References

External links
Town of Vivian, official website

Towns in Louisiana
Towns in Caddo Parish, Louisiana
Towns in Shreveport – Bossier City metropolitan area